The Cluj-Napoca Metro is a planned rapid transit system for the city of Cluj-Napoca, Romania. If built, it will become Romania's second mass transit network after the Bucharest Metro. The proposed system is of light metro type with a transport capacity of around 15,200–21,600 passengers per hour per direction.

Background 
In late 2018 studies began for a proposed Cluj-Napoca Metro, with mayor Emil Boc confirming "I hope we'll be able to launch the call for the tenders of the pre-feasibility study in the first 10 days of November. Investments higher than EUR 75 million need pre-feasibility and feasibility studies, according to the law". Boc signed contracts in April 2020 for the feasibility study of the metro along with a suburban rail network. As of December 2021, the costs of the investment are estimated at over 2 billion euros, with an estimated project implementation time of about 10 years.

In December 2022, the Ministry of Transport and Infrastructure signed the financing contract for the construction of the Cluj-Napoca Metro with a value of 13.69 billion lei. In February 2023, the design and execution works of the Line I of the Cluj metro were awarded to the association Gülermak – Alstom Transport – Arcada Company.

Route 
The initial  segment of the metro will follow an east-west axis from Florești situated in the western area of the city to the Aurel Vlaicu /Pod IRA area, via future regional hospital, VIVO! Cluj and Mănăștur areas, and the city centre.

Works on the first stage of the project, between Sfânta Maria – Europa Unită (9 stations and the depot), are expected to be completed by August 2026. The next stage foresees the construction of the last two sections, Țara Moților – Sfânta Maria (7 stations) and Piața Mărăști – Muncii (3 stations), which total .

References 

Proposed rail infrastructure in Romania
Rapid transit in Romania
Rail transport in Romania
Underground rapid transit in Romania
Cluj-Napoca